Hamilton-Brown Shoe Company Building, now the Selwyn Place Apartments, is a historic factory building located at Boonville, Cooper County, Missouri. It was built in 1919 by the Hamilton-Brown Shoe Company, and is a four-story, rectangular brick industrial building with a flat roof.  The roof is framed by a corbelled parapet capped with tile coping.  The building features a five-story elevator tower and four-story tower which housed restrooms.  Also on the property are the contributing power plant building and oil house.

It was listed on the National Register of Historic Places in 1990.

See also
Hamilton-Brown Shoe Factory (Columbia, Missouri)
Hamilton-Brown Shoe Factory (St. Louis, Missouri)

References

Industrial buildings and structures on the National Register of Historic Places in Missouri
Industrial buildings completed in 1919
National Register of Historic Places in Cooper County, Missouri
Shoe factories
1919 establishments in Missouri
Apartment buildings in Missouri
Boonville, Missouri
Caleres